Steven Fletcher may refer to:

 Steven Fletcher (politician) (born 1972), Brazilian-born Canadian politician
 Steven Fletcher (footballer) (born 1987), Scottish footballer
 Steven Fletcher (ice hockey) (born 1962), Canadian ice hockey player

See also
 Steve Fletcher (born 1972), English footballer